François-Pierre Blin or Pierre-François Blin, was born in Rennes on 8 June 1756, and died on 4 November 1834 in Chantenay-sur-Loire. He was a doctor and politician, and member of the Estates-General of 1789.

1756 births
1834 deaths
Politicians from Rennes
Politicians of the Ancien Régime in France
18th-century French physicians
19th-century French physicians
Jacobins
Chevaliers of the Légion d'honneur
Medical educators
Academic staff of the University of Nantes
University of Montpellier alumni